Everything Is Boring and Everyone Is a Fucking Liar is the second studio album by Spank Rock. It was released through Bad Blood Records on September 27, 2011. It peaked at number 14 on the Billboard Top Dance/Electronic Albums chart.

Critical reception

At Metacritic, which assigns a weighted average score out of 100 to reviews from mainstream critics, the album received an average score of 60, based on 13 reviews, indicating "mixed or average reviews".

John Bush of AllMusic gave the album 4 out of 5 stars, writing, "There's less of a party atmosphere, sometimes literally (since there are few guests), although there's still plenty of rhyming about girls and substances backed by martial snares and metronome bass claps." Philip Bloomfield of Drowned in Sound described the album as "a bold, brash, varied, slightly confused dance record with flashes of hip-hop." Will Hermes of Rolling Stone commented that "if there's a guiding spirit here, it's 1980s Prince: wildly funky pop music led by an impressive creative hard-on." Puja Patel of Spin wrote, "Employing a variety of producers, Everything undertakes a cathartic reinvention via late-night, sex-driven trips through dim, sweaty basement parties."

Meanwhile, Nate Patrin of Pitchfork was critical, writing, "[Spank Rock's] rhymes are occasionally vaguely political, sometimes intentionally disingenuous, but never confident enough to tell you just where he stands." David Amidon of PopMatters mirrored this, stating, "Everything Is Boring sounds very uninspired, very trapped in its moment, very everything YoYoYoYoYo succeeded in being the opposite of." Sam Richards of NME commented that Boys Noize's beats "generally lack any semblance of swing or groove."

Track listing

Personnel
Credits adapted from liner notes.

 Naeem Juwan – vocals
 Boys Noize – production (1, 3, 6, 7, 10, 14), additional production (2, 4, 5, 9, 11), additional sounds (2, 4, 5, 9, 11, 12), additional guitar (14), additional bass guitar (14), additional keyboards (14), mixing
 Big Freedia – vocals (2)
 Prince Terrence – extra vocals (2), extra percussion (2)
 Le1f – production (2, 4)
 Santigold – vocals (3)
 Squeaky Clean – production (3)
 XXXChange – production (5, 12)
 Mark Ronson – production (6)
 Charles Martucci – production (9)
 Christopher Devlin – production (9)
 Savage Skulls – production (11)
 Tyler Pope – production (12)
 Zeb – production (13)
 Stephanie – additional vocals (14)
 Future People – guitar (14), bass guitar (14)
 Paul Taylor – drums (14)
 Johnny Siera – additional guitar (14), additional percussion (14)
 Dan Walker – additional guitar (14), additional percussion (14)
 Nilesh Patel – mastering
 Alex Da Corte – cover art
 Mathias Kessler – photography
 David Rudnick – art direction, design, layout, typography
 Jane Morledge – art direction

Charts

References

External links
 

2011 albums
Spank Rock albums
Albums produced by Boys Noize
Albums produced by Mark Ronson
Albums produced by XXXChange